INS Sindhuraj (S57) (King of the Sea) is a   diesel-electric submarine of the Indian Navy.

References

Sindhughosh-class submarines
Attack submarines
Ships built in the Soviet Union
1987 ships
Submarines of India